Camp Castor is an international peacekeeping forward operating base in the town of Gao, Mali, supporting activities of the United Nations Multidimensional Integrated Stabilization Mission in Mali (MINUSMA) since 2014.

History 
After the Netherlands contributed 380 troops to MINUSMA in April 2014, these forces began building Camp Castor to accommodate special forces and helicopters among other assets. German aircraft replaced the seven departing Dutch  helicopters in early 2017, as overall command of the base also transitioned to the Bundeswehr. Special forces from Denmark and the Czech Republic were also stationed at Castor.

Location 
Camp Castor is in between the joint civilian-military MINUSMA camp Supercamp and the southeastern edge of the Gao International Airport. The French army operates a nearby base serving Operation Barkhane. At the northeast end of the airfield is Camp Firhoun Ag Alinsar, a Malian army base. Adjoined to Castor is the UK element of MINUSMA; Camp Roberts, housing LRRG(M) with supporting elements from the Army and RAF.

Incidents 
An Apache helicopter of the Dutch Army crashed in March 2015 after an attempted emergency landing near Gao. 

In July 2017 a Camp Castor-based, German Eurocopter Tiger crashed at  Tabankort in Bourem Cercle, killing both crewmembers.

Media Coverage 
The German Ministry of Defence published a 40-episode video series documenting the everyday lives of peacekeeping troops in Camp Castor.

References

Military of the Netherlands

Gao Region